Jenny Hendershott (born December 12, 1971) is a professional fitness competitor from the United States. In the fitness industry she is well known for her inventive and highly difficult gymnastic routines as well as running her special phat camps all year round where she helps women get serious about their diet, exercise and overall health. Her highest achievement to date has been winning the 2005 Fitness International and 2005 Fitness Olympia events.

Vital stats 

Full name: Jenny Hendershott
Birthday: December 12
Place of birth: Ashland, Ohio
Current state of residence: Burlington, North Carolina
Occupation: personal trainer, fitness model, former school teacher.
Marital status: married to Brian Kinn since 2001.
Height: 5'4"
Weight (in season): 135-138 lbs. (Off-season): 138-142 lbs.
Eye Color: Blue
Hair Color: blonde (with brown low-lights).

Bodybuilding philosophy
Hendershott's training consists of a combination of simple compound movements with free weights and body weight exercises such as push-ups and bodyweight squats (she sometimes uses machines and cables). She typically trains five days a week in the off-season and on-season focusing on her chest, back, and arms as primary muscle groups in order to make them match her strong legs and shoulders. Jen usually trains two body parts per day in the off-season, and performs one or two cardio sessions a day (one with her weight training and another one at night). She also trains her abs three times a week.

Contest history
1997 NPC Mike Francois World Gym Classic, first
1997 NPC Junior National Championships, second
1997 NPC Nationals Championships, fourth
1998 NPC USA Fitness Championships 10th, routine winner
1998 NPC North Americans, second, routine winner
1998 NPC Nationals Championships, seventh, routine winner
1999 NPC USA Fitness Championships, first (pro qualifier)
2000 IFBB Fitness International, fifth
2000 IFBB Jan Tana Fitness Classic, fourth
2000 IFBB Pittsburgh Pro Show, fourth
2000 IFBB Fitness Olympia, seventh
2001 IFBB Fitness International, fourth
2001 IFBB Jan Tana Fitness Classic, second
2001 IFBB Pittsburgh Pro Show, second
2001 IFBB Fitness Olympia, sixth
2002 IFBB Fitness International, third
2002 IFBB New York Pro Show, second
2002 IFBB Southwest Pro Show, second
2002 IFBB Jan Tan Fitness Classic, fourth
2002 IFBB Fitness Olympia, fifth
2003 IFBB Fitness International, fifth
2002 IFBB GNC Show Of Strength, fourth
2003 IFBB Fitness Olympia, fifth
2003 IFBB GNC Show Of Strength, third
2004 IFBB Fitness International, third
2004 IFBB GNC Show Of Strength, third
2004 IFBB Fitness Olympia, second
2005 IFBB Fitness International, first
2005 IFBB Fitness Olympia, first
2006 IFBB Fitness International, third
2006 IFBB Fitness Olympia, third
2007 IFBB Fitness International, second
2007 IFBB Fitness Olympia, third
2008 IFBB Fitness Olympia, first

Magazine references 

Farrar Meyers, Maureen. Champion Chest. California: Muscle and Fitness. August 2006 Edition. ISSN 0744-5105. (New York, NY: Weider Publications, LLC., a division of American Media Inc., 2006.). Section: Training and Fitness: 210-212, 214,216, and 217 covers Hendershott's article.

1971 births
Living people
Fitness and figure competitors
People from Ashland, Ohio